DE-CIX (Deutsche Commercial Internet Exchange) is an operator of carrier- and data-center-neutral Internet Exchanges, with operations in Europe, North America, Africa, the Middle East, India and Southeast Asia. All DE-CIX activities and companies are brought together under the umbrella of the DE-CIX Group AG.

The DE-CIX internet exchange point (IXP) situated in Frankfurt, Germany, is one of the largest IXPs worldwide in terms of peak traffic, with throughput of 14.40 Tbit/s in December 2022. In addition to DE-CIX in Frankfurt, DE-CIX operates IXPs in approx. 40 locations around the globe, with 3 further IXs exchanging peak traffic in excess of 1 Tbit/s, these being DE-CIX New York, DE-CIX Madrid, and DE-CIX Mumbai, [JP2] with DE-CIX Mumbai becoming the largest IXP in the APAC according to PeeringDB in 2021 [JE3]. 

The DE-CIX global IXs (including presence in partner IXs) include:

Europe: Barcelona, Berlin (powered by BCIX), Bucharest (powered by InterLAN), Düsseldorf, Frankfurt, Hamburg, Istanbul, Leipzig, Lisbon, Madrid, Marseille, Munich, Palermo, Prague (powered by NIX.CZ), Ruhr-CIX powered by DE-CIX, SEE-CIX powered by DE-CIX in Athens and Warsaw (powered by ATMAN) 

Nordics: Copenhagen, Esbjerg, Helsinki, Kristiansand, Oslo

Africa: Kinshasa (DRC), Lagos (Nigeria), and Tripoli (Libya)

North America: Chicago, Dallas, New York, Phoenix, and Richmond

GCC: Aqaba IX powered by DE-CIX in Jordan, UAE-IX powered by DE-CIX in Dubai), IRAQ-IXP powered by DE-CIX

India: Chennai, Delhi, Mumbai, and Kolkata

Southeast Asia: Singapore, Kuala Lumpur, Johor Bahru, Bandar Seri Begawan (Borneo-IX powered by DE-CIX) and Manila (powered by GetaFIX)

Management board 
Ivo Ivanov (CEO), Thomas King (CTO), Christian Reuter (CSO) and Sebastian Seifert (CFO) are responsible for the global business as the Management Board. Felix Höger, Klaus Landefeld, Rudolf van Megen and Harald A. Summa represent the Supervisory Board of DE-CIX Group AG. In addition, Harald A. Summa was the Managing Director of DE-CIX Group AG from 1996 to 2022 and Chair of the Management Board from 2017 to 2022.

History

DE-CIX was founded in 1995 by three Internet Service Providers (ISPs). Back then, German Internet traffic was still exchanged in the United States. To improve latency and reduce costs for backhaul connectivity, three providers decided to establish an Internet Exchange in the back room of a postal office in Gutleutviertel in Frankfurt. Hamburg-based MAZ, EUnet from Dortmund and XLink from Karlsruhe were the first to connect their networks in Frankfurt at DE-CIX.

DE-CIX was originally managed by Electronic Commerce Forum, now known as eco –  Association of the Internet Industry. Other providers joined and made DE-CIX and Frankfurt the hotspot for the German internet. In 1998, DE-CIX moved its switching hardware to the Interxion data center in Frankfurt.

By 2000, DE-CIX had become Germany's largest Internet Exchange and was ranked as one of the larger Internet Exchanges in Europe. DE-CIX added its second switching site at the Interxion campus in 2001 and a third site in close proximity to its original roots at the TelecityGroup data center in 2004.

Until 2006, Cisco switches supported the growth in customers and traffic. DE-CIX extended its reach to additional data centers, introducing Force10 and Brocade switches and scaling the platform to over 700 10-Gigabit ports. Over the years, DE-CIX has attracted networks from all over the world, especially from Eastern Europe, leading to an annual traffic growth rate of up to 100 percent per year.

In 2012, DE-CIX began its international expansion with the establishment of its first IX outside of Germany, UAE-IX powered by DE-CIX, together with partner du/datamena, in Dubai. Following this, in 2014, DE-CIX established its first IX in North America with the launch of DE-CIX New York. Further expansions followed in close succession, in Southern Europe in 2016, in India in 2018 in India with Mumbai-IX powered by DE-CIX, later to become DE-CIX Mumbai, and in 2021 in Southeast Asia.

Current
In September 2022, more than 3,000 network operators (carriers), Internet service providers (ISPs), content providers, corporate networks and other organizations from more than 100 countries were connected to DE-CIX, including major carriers, content and Internet service providers, and numerous enterprise customers. The company operates approx. 40 IXs on 4 continents, and its interconnection services are accessible from data centers in 600+ cities worldwide. 

In September 2022, a data throughput of 13.65 terabits per second was achieved at DE-CIX Frankfurt for the first time. According to its Annual Report 2021, DE-CIX had a connected customer capacity of over 96.2 Tbit/s at the end of 2021.

The IX operator experienced massive growth during the Covid-19 pandemic, regularly breaking traffic throughput records. DE-CIX Frankfurt, for example, exceeded 9 tbit/s peak traffic for the first time in March 2020, and 10 tbit/s in November of the same year.

In 2013, DE-CIX introduced DE-CIX Apollon, its new Ethernet-based platform. Today, the platform utilizes the ADVA Optical Networking FSP 3000 and Infinera CloudExpress 2 gear for the optical backbone, and Nokia’s 7950 XRS series and Nokia’s 7750 SR-s series for the IP network. The optical backbone has a total capacity of 48 Terabits per second across a mesh-network topology and provides transport speeds of up to 8 Terabits per second per fiber. DE-CIX Apollon is built on the best possible platform components, delivering high-availability peering with full 100G, 400G and even 800G Ethernet capabilities. DE-CIX Apollon utilizes state-of-the-art DWDM equipment and is built on a switching layer supported by Nokia (former Alcatel-Lucent) service routers, which support up to 1440x100 Gigabit Ethernet ports or up to 288x400 Gigabit Ethernet ports.The setup of the platform is completely redundant and there is 24/7/365 fault monitoring in place.

In 2017, DE-CIX began to develop interconnection services for the enterprise sector, beginning with the introduction of DirectCLOUD, a service that enables customers to access cloud service providers.  In 2022, the DirectCLOUD service enables connectivity to more than 50 cloud service providers, including specialized local CSPs and global hyperscalers. Other interconnection services specifically designed for the needs of enterprises include: the Microsoft Azure Peering Service, Closed User Groups, and InterconnectionFLEX.

In 2019, DE-CIX was one of 3 IX operators to jointly develop the IX-API, which provides the basis for the automation of interconnection services over IXPs. In 2021, DE-CIX received a patent for its security service “Blackholing Advanced”, which enables innovative filtering mechanisms in the protection of networks against DDoS attacks.

See also
List of Internet exchange points
List of Internet exchange points by size

References

External links
 
 netzpolitik.org, Andre Meister: How the German Foreign Intelligence Agency BND tapped the Internet Exchange Point DE-CIX in Frankfurt, since 2009, 2015-03-31

Internet exchange points in Germany
Mass media in Frankfurt
Economy of Frankfurt